Eleanor McDougall (1873–1956) was a Resident Lecturer in Classics at Westfield College, London from 1902, and later one of the pioneers in women's education in India. She was the First Principal  of  Women's Christian College in Madras, Madras Presidency in British India in 1915.

References

1873 births
1956 deaths
Founders of Indian schools and colleges
Academics of Westfield College
Alumni of Royal Holloway, University of London
British expatriates in India
English classical scholars
Schoolteachers from Greater Manchester